Kalkhvoran-e Viyand (also Romanized as Kalkhvorān-e Vīyand, Kalkhūrān-e Vīānd, and Kalkhūrān-e Vīyand) is a village in the Central District of Sareyn County, Ardabil Province, Iran. At the 2006 census, its population was 447 in 115 families.

References 

Towns and villages in Sareyn County